Abdulkareem Elemosho (born August 10, 1977 in Ilorin) is a Nigerian football (soccer) player currently with Kwara United F.C. of Nigeria.

Trivia 
His favourite jersey number is 22 and his boot size is 10, his ambition is to become a coach.

He played for Kwara United F.C. of Ilorin (1998–1999), Shooting Stars Sports Club (3SC) of Ibadan (2000–2001), Sunshine Stars F.C. of Akure (2003–2004) Kwara United F.C. of Ilorin 2001–2003, 2004 to date). He is a National Challenge Cup champion in 2000.

References

1977 births
Living people
Nigerian Muslims
Nigerian footballers
Association football goalkeepers
Kwara United F.C. players
Sunshine Stars F.C. players
People from Ilorin